Gura or Guda is a small village in Nakodar. Nakodar is a tehsil in the city Jalandhar of Indian state of Punjab.

STD code 
Gura's STD code is 01821.

References

Villages in Jalandhar district
Villages in Nakodar tehsil